John Scott (before 1534-1619), of Chippenham, Wiltshire, was an English clothier and Member of Parliament.

He was a Member (MP) of the Parliament of England for Chippenham in 1571 and 1572.

References

Year of birth missing
1619 deaths
16th-century English people
People of the Tudor period
People from Chippenham
Members of the Parliament of England (pre-1707)